Geremis Segundo González Acosta (January 8, 1975 – May 25, 2008) was a Venezuelan right-handed pitcher in Major League Baseball who played for the Chicago Cubs (–), Tampa Bay Devil Rays (–), Boston Red Sox, New York Mets and Milwaukee Brewers (2006). In his rookie season he led the Cubs with 11 wins, but he was unable to continue that success in later seasons. He was known as Jeremi González until he was traded to the Brewers in 2006, at which time he informed the team of the proper spelling.

Professional career
González was born in Maracaibo, Zulia State. He made his debut in 1997, posting a record of 11–9 and finishing ninth in voting for the National League's Rookie of the Year Award. He also pitched for the Cubs in 1998, then pitched in the minor leagues for nearly five years between three surgeries and a variety of injuries.

In 2003, he was rewarded by Tampa Bay with the Out of Nowhere Award. González ended up being the Rays' most consistent pitcher, despite his 6–11 record. He allowed three runs or fewer in 17 starts, but received the lowest run support of any AL East starter (3.91 runs per game). He finished with a 3.91 earned run average and 97 strikeouts in 156 innings. González was the pitcher on June 3, 2003, when Sammy Sosa was caught using a corked bat.

Early in the 2005 season, González started three games for the Boston Red Sox, going 1–1 with a 6.65 ERA. Boston optioned him to the Triple-A Pawtucket Red Sox in late May 2005, then recalled him to the major league club in early July to try to fill a hole in the back end of their bullpen. He appeared in Game 1 of the AL Division Series, a 14–2 loss to the Chicago White Sox, and allowed four runs in 2⅓ innings, including a three-run home run by Scott Podsednik.

In 2006, González started three games for the Mets but performed poorly. During the season, he was traded to the Milwaukee Brewers in exchange for pitcher Mike Adams.

In a six-season majors career, González posted a 30–35 record with 354 strikeouts and a 4.93 ERA in 131 appearances, including 83 starts, four complete games, two shutouts, and 572 ⅔ innings pitched.

González is one of 583 pitchers to have faced Barry Bonds six or more times in his career and the only one of that group never to have allowed him to reach base.

On May 9, the Yomiuri Giants of Japan's Central League signed González. He became the fifth Venezuelan player to play in the JCL during the 2007 season, joining fellow countrymen Alex Cabrera, Darwin Cubillán, Luis González and Alex Ramírez.

Death
González died after being struck by lightning in Punta Palma, Zulia on May 25, 2008.

See also
 List of baseball players who died during their careers
 List of Major League Baseball players from Venezuela

References

External links
, or Japanese Baseball, or Retrosheet, or Pelota Binaria (Venezuelan League)

1975 births
2008 deaths
Accidental deaths in Venezuela
Águilas del Zulia players
Arizona League Cubs players
Arizona League Rockies players
Boston Red Sox players
Chicago Cubs players
Daytona Cubs players
Deaths from lightning strikes
Durham Bulls players
Huntington Cubs players
Iowa Cubs players
Lansing Lugnuts players
Major League Baseball pitchers
Major League Baseball players from Venezuela
Milwaukee Brewers players
Natural disaster deaths in Venezuela
Navegantes del Magallanes players
New York Mets players
Nippon Professional Baseball pitchers
Norfolk Tides players
Oklahoma RedHawks players
Orlando Cubs players
Pawtucket Red Sox players
Peoria Chiefs players
Rockford Cubbies players
Sportspeople from Maracaibo
Syracuse Chiefs players
Tampa Bay Devil Rays players
Venezuelan expatriate baseball players in Japan
Venezuelan expatriate baseball players in the United States
West Tennessee Diamond Jaxx players
Williamsport Cubs players
Yomiuri Giants players